The 1987 Wagner Seahawks football team was an American football team that represented Wagner College as an independent during the 1987 NCAA Division III football season. In their seventh season under head coach Walt Hameline, the Seahawks compiled a 13–1 record, outscored opponents by a total of 403 to 164, and won the NCAA Division III championship.

The team was led on offense by quarterback Greg Kovar and tailback Terry Underwood.

The team played its home games at Wagner College Stadium on Staten Island.

Schedule

References

Wagner
Wagner Seahawks football seasons
NCAA Division III Football Champions
Wagner Seahawks football